CG 4, commonly referred to as God's Hand, is a star-forming region located in the Puppis constellation, about  from Earth. It is one of several objects referred to as "cometary globules", because its shape is similar to that of a comet.

, and the nearby cometary globules, generally point away from the Vela Supernova Remnant, located at the center of the Gum Nebula.

Discovery 
In 1976, photographs from the UK Schmidt Telescope—operated by the Australian Astronomical Observatory—showed several objects resembling comets, located in the Gum Nebula, an emission nebula of the constellation. Due to their particular shape, these objects came to be known as cometary globules. Each globule has a dense, dark, ruptured head and a very long tail, with the latter pointing away from the Vela Supernova Remnant.

Structure 
The head of cometary globule  resembles a comet with a dusty cavernous mouth, as photographed by the European Southern Observatory's Very Large Telescope in 2015. Composed of relatively dense, dark matter, it is an opaque structure that is being illuminated by the glow of a nearby star. An obscure red glow limbing the globule is possibly caused by emission from ionized hydrogen. The mouth of the globule appears to be ready to consume the edge-on spiral galaxy . In reality, the galaxy is over a hundred million light-years further away from the globule.

References 

Dark nebulae
Puppis
Star-forming regions